Muhlenbergia lindheimeri is a species of bunch grass, 3-6' H, known by the common names big muhly, blue muhly, and 	
Lindheimer's muhly. It is native to North America, where it can be found in northern Mexico and up to the Edwards Plateau region of Texas. It is also grown as an ornamental grass. as it is useful as a green screen (instead of Pampass grass), erosion control, water retention and nest material for many species of birds

This species is a perennial grass forming clumps of erect stems up to 1.5 meters tall. The ligule may be up to 3.5 centimeters in length. The leaves are up to 55 centimeters long and are flat or folded. The inflorescence is a panicle up to 50 centimeters long which is often purplish in color, with grayish spikelets.

This grass provides graze for cattle and horses, but it is not one of the more palatable grasses because it is wiry. In the wild the grass grows in calcareous soils.

Ornamental cultivars of this species include 'Autumn Glow'.

References

External links
USDA Plants Profile for Muhlenbergia lindheimeri (Lindheimer's muhly)
Lady Bird Johnson Wildflower Center 

lindheimeri
Grasses of Mexico
Grasses of the United States
Flora of Texas
Garden plants of North America
Drought-tolerant plants
Least concern flora of North America
Least concern biota of Mexico
Least concern flora of the United States